Adolfo Lazzarini Osorio (7 May 1952 – 1 July 2010) was a naturalized Paraguayan footballer who played as a winger.

Career
Born in Sauce, Corrientes, Lazzarini moved from Argentina to the Paraguayan city of Pilar where he played for local Club America in 1972. In 1974, he was transferred to Olimpia Asunción and afterwards he played for various clubs such as River Plate (Asunción), Libertad and Cruz Azul of Mexico before returning to Olimpia in 1979, year in which the team won the Copa Libertadores. He then played in 1980 for LDU Quito and came back to Paraguay in 1982 to play for Cerro Porteño of Presidente Franco to put an end to his career.

Since Lazzarini acquired to Paraguayan citizenship at a young age, he was able to play a twelve matches for the Paraguay national football team.

Personal
In 2010, Lazzarini died following a long illness in Asunción.

Titles

References

External links

Biography and profile at Albirroja.com

1952 births
2010 deaths
People from Sauce, Corrientes
Argentine footballers
Paraguayan footballers
Club Olimpia footballers
Club Libertad footballers
Cruz Azul footballers
L.D.U. Quito footballers
Paraguayan Primera División players
Liga MX players
Expatriate footballers in Argentina
Expatriate footballers in Ecuador
Expatriate footballers in Mexico
Paraguay international footballers
Argentine emigrants to Paraguay
Naturalized citizens of Paraguay
Association football forwards
Sportspeople from Corrientes Province